Arbi Trab (born 15 February 1965) is a Tunisian weightlifter. He competed in the men's bantamweight event at the 1992 Summer Olympics.

References

1965 births
Living people
Tunisian male weightlifters
Olympic weightlifters of Tunisia
Weightlifters at the 1992 Summer Olympics
Place of birth missing (living people)
20th-century Tunisian people